Abdul Rauf al-Kasm (born 1932) is a Syrian architect, academic and politician who served as prime minister of Syria during the 1980s.

Early life
Kasm was born in Damascus in 1932.

Career
Kasm was professor of architecture at Damascus University. He was a member of the Baath Party. He served as Prime Minister of Syria from 9 January 1980 to 1 November 1987 under the presidency of Hafez Al-Asad. Enjoying full support of president Assad, Kasm tried to end corruption by senior officers. However, his clash with then defense minister Mustafa Tlass led to his removal from office in 1987. After leaving office, he served as a senior consultant for national security.

References

1932 births
Living people
Prime Ministers of Syria
Members of the Regional Command of the Arab Socialist Ba'ath Party – Syria Region
Academic staff of Damascus University
Syrian architects